KFXR-FM (107.3 MHz) is a radio station licensed to serve Chinle, Arizona.  The station is owned by iHeartMedia, Inc. and licensed to iHM Licenses, LLC. It airs a country music format.

The station was assigned the KFXR-FM call letters by the Federal Communications Commission on November 12, 2001.

Ownership
In May 2007, GoodRadio.TV LLC (Dean Goodman, president/CEO) reached an agreement to acquire KFXR-FM from Clear Channel Communications as part of a single massive 175 station deal valued at a reported $452.1 million. The deal fell through when its financing group, American Securities Capital Partners, objected to the deal's cost.

References

External links

FXR-FM
Country radio stations in the United States
Mass media in Apache County, Arizona
Radio stations established in 2001
2001 establishments in Arizona
IHeartMedia radio stations